The Williamsburg Charter is a document that was drafted in 1986 by several Americans, each a member of a prominent religious community and/or non-religious philosophy in the United States.  The Charter was signed by 100 nationally prominent figures on June 22, 1988, in commemoration of the 200th anniversary of Virginia's call for a Bill of Rights.  Among the signers were Presidents Gerald Ford and Jimmy Carter; the late Chief Justice of the US Supreme Court William Rehnquist; the late activist Coretta Scott King (wife of slain civil rights leader Martin Luther King Jr.) and Focus on the Family founder James Dobson. The lead drafter was Os Guinness.

The document is an affirmation for a lively and reasoned debate on the role of religion in the public life of the United States.  Its primary focus is on the Establishment Clause and Free Exercise Clause, contained within the first amendment of the United States Constitution, and the goal of the writers is to "affirm both their cardinal assumptions and the reasons for their crucial national importance".  The writers believe that the problems surrounding the religion clauses can only be solved by first understanding the nature of the clauses.  Among the points raised in the charter is that non-religious hostility towards religion is just as dangerous to a democracy as religious hostility towards non-religion or to other religions.

References

Political charters
United States documents
1988 in American politics
1986 documents
1986 in religion